Betty Carter (born Lillie Mae Jones; May 16, 1929 – September 26, 1998) was an American jazz singer known for her improvisational technique, scatting and other complex musical abilities that demonstrated her vocal talent and imaginative interpretation of lyrics and melodies. Vocalist Carmen McRae once remarked: "There's really only one jazz singer—only one: Betty Carter."

Early life
Carter was born in Flint, Michigan, and grew up in Detroit, where her father, James Jones, was the musical director of a Detroit church and her mother, Bessie, was a housewife. As a child, Carter was raised to be extremely independent and to not expect nurturing from her family. Even 30 years after leaving home, Carter was still very aware of and affected by the home life she was raised in, and was quoted saying:
I have been far removed from my immediate family. There's been no real contact or phone calls home every week to find out how everybody is…As far as family is concerned, it's been a lonesome trek…It's probably just as much my fault as it is theirs, and I can't blame anybody for it. But there was…no real closeness, where the family urged me on, or said…'We're proud'…and all that. No, no…none of that happened.

While the lack of support from Carter's family caused her to feel isolated, it may also have instilled self-reliance and determination to succeed. She studied piano at the Detroit Conservatory at the age of 15, but only attained a modest level of expertise.

At the age of 16, Carter began singing. As her parents were not big proponents of her pursuing a singing career, she would sneak out at night to audition for amateur shows. After winning first place at her first amateur competition, Carter felt as though she were being accepted into the music world and decided that she must pursue it tirelessly. When she began performing live, she was too young to be admitted into bars, so she obtained a forged birth certificate to gain entry in order to perform.

Career

Even at a young age, Carter was able to bring a new vocal style to jazz. The breathiness of her voice was a characteristic seldom heard before her appearance on the music scene. She also was well known for her passion for scat singing and her strong belief that the throwaway attitude that most jazz musicians approached it with was inappropriate and wasteful.  Her scatting was known to display a degree of spontaneity and basic inventiveness that was seldom seen elsewhere.

Detroit, where Carter grew up, was a hotbed of jazz growth. After signing with a talent agent after her win at amateur night, Carter had opportunities to perform with famous jazz artists such as Dizzy Gillespie, who visited Detroit for an extensive amount of time. Gillespie is often considered responsible for her strong passion for scatting. In earlier recordings, it is apparent that her scatting had similarities to the qualities of Gillespie's.

At the time of Gillespie's visit, Charlie Parker was receiving treatment in a psychiatric hospital, delaying her encounter with him. However, Carter eventually performed with Parker, as well as with his band consisting of Tommy Potter, Max Roach, and Miles Davis. After receiving praise from both Gillespie and Parker for her vocal prowess, Carter felt an upsurge in confidence and knew that she could make it in the business with perseverance.

Carter's confidence was well-founded. In 1948, she was asked by Lionel Hampton to join his band. She finally had her big break. Working with Hampton's group gave her the chance to be bandmates with artists such as Charles Mingus and Wes Montgomery, as well as with Ernest Harold "Benny" Bailey, who had recently vacated Gillespie's band and Albert Thornton "Al" Grey who would later go on to join Gillespie's band. Hampton had an ear for talent and a love for bebop. Carter too had a deep love for bebop as well as a talent for it. Hampton's wife Gladys gave her the nickname "Betty Bebop", a nickname she reportedly detested. Despite her good ear and charming personality, Carter was fiercely independent and tended to attempt to resist Hampton's direction, while Hampton had a temper and was quick to anger. Hampton expected a lot from his players and did not want them to forget that he was the band's leader. She openly hated his swing style, refused to sing in a swinging way, and she was far too outspoken for his tastes. Carter honed her scat singing ability while on tour, which was not well received by Hampton as he did not enjoy her penchant for improvisation. Over the course of two and a half years, Hampton fired Carter a total of seven times.

Carter was part of the Lionel Hampton Orchestra that played at the famed Cavalcade of Jazz in Los Angeles at Wrigley Field which was produced by Leon Hefflin, Sr. on July 10, 1949. They did a second concert at Lane Field in San Diego on September 3, 1949. They also performed at the sixth famed Cavalcade of Jazz concert on June 25, 1950. Also featured on the same day were Roy Milton & His Solid Senders, Pee Wee Crayton's Orchestra, Dinah Washington, Tiny Davis & Her Hell Divers, and other artists. 16,000 people were reported to be in attendance and the concert ended early because of a fracas while Hampton's band played "Flying High".

Being a part of Hampton's band provided a few things for "The Kid" (a nickname bestowed upon Carter that stuck for the rest of her life): connections, and a new approach to music, making it so that all future musical attitudes that came from Carter bore the mark of Hampton's guidance. Because Hampton hired Carter, she also goes down in history as one of the last big band era jazz singers in history. However, by 1951, Carter left the band. After a short recuperation back home, Carter was in New York, working all over the city for the better part of the early 1950s, as well as participating in an extensive tour of the south, playing for "camp shows". This work made little to no money, but Carter believed it was necessary to develop as an artist and was a way to "pay her dues".

Very soon after Carter arrived in New York City, she was allowed to record with King Pleasure and the Ray Bryant Trio, becoming more recognizable and well-known and subsequently being granted the chance to sing at the Apollo Theatre. This theatre was known for giving up-and-coming artists the final shove into becoming household names. Carter was propelled into prominence, recording with Epic label by 1955, and was a well-known artist by the late 1950s. Her first solo LP, Out There, was released on the Peacock label in 1958.

Miles Davis can be credited for Carter's bump in popularity, as he was the person who recommended to Ray Charles that he take Carter under his wing. Carter began touring with Charles in 1960, then making a recording of duets with him in 1961 (Ray Charles and Betty Carter), including the R&B-chart-topping "Baby, It's Cold Outside", which brought her a measure of popular recognition. In 1963 she toured in Japan with Sonny Rollins. She recorded for various labels during this period, including ABC-Paramount, Atco and United Artists, but was rarely satisfied with the resulting product. After three years of touring with Charles and a total of two recordings together, Carter took a hiatus from recording to marry. She and her husband had two children. However, she continued performing, not wanting to be dependent upon her husband for financial support.

The 1960s became an increasingly difficult time for Carter as she began to slip into fame, refusing to sing contemporary pop music, and her youth fading. Carter was nearly forty years old, which at the time was not conducive to a career in the public eye. Rock and roll, like pop, was steadily becoming more popular and provided cash flow for labels and recording companies. Carter had to work extremely hard to continue to book gigs because of the jazz decline. Her marriage also was beginning to crumble. By 1971, Carter was single and mainly performing live with a small group consisting of merely a piano, drums, and a bass. The Betty Carter trio was one of the very few jazz groups to continue to book gigs in the late 1960s and early 1970s.

Carter created her record label, Bet-Car Records, in 1969, the sole recording source of Carter's music for the next eighteen years:

Some of her most famous recordings were originally issued on Bet-Car, including the double album The Audience with Betty Carter (1980). In 1980 she was the subject of a documentary film by Michelle Parkerson, But Then, She's Betty Carter. Carter's approach to music did not concern solely her method of recording and distribution, but also her choice of venues. Carter began performing at colleges and universities, starting in 1972 at Goddard College in Vermont. Carter was excited at this opportunity, as it was since the mid-1960s that Carter had been wanting to visit schools and provide some sort of education for students. She began lecturing along with her musical performances, informing students of the history of jazz and its roots.

By 1975, Carter's life and work prospects began to improve, and Carter was beginning to be able to pick her jobs once again, touring in Europe, South America, and the United States. In 1976, Carter was a guest live performer on Saturday Night Live′s first season on the air, and was also a performer at the Newport Jazz Festival in 1977 and 1978, carving out a permanent place for herself in the music business as well as in the world of jazz.

In 1977, Carter enjoyed a new peak in critical and popular estimation, and taught a master class with her past mentor, Dizzy Gillespie, at Harvard. In the last decade of her life, Carter began to receive even wider acclaim and recognition. In 1987 she signed with Verve Records, who reissued most of her Bet-Car albums on CD for the first time and made them available to wider audiences. In 1988 she won a Grammy for her album Look What I Got! and sang in a guest appearance on The Cosby Show (episode "How Do You Get to Carnegie Hall?"). In 1994 she performed at the White House and was a headliner at Verve's 50th-anniversary celebration in Carnegie Hall. She was the subject of a 1994 short film by Dick Fontaine, Betty Carter: New All the Time.

In 1997 she was awarded a National Medal of Arts by President Bill Clinton. This award was one of the thousands, but Carter considered this medal to be the most important that she received in her lifetime.

Death
Carter continued to perform, tour, and record, as well as search for new talent until she was diagnosed with pancreatic cancer in the summer of 1998. She died on September 26, 1998, at the age of 69, and was cremated. She was survived by her two sons.

Legacy
Carter often recruited young accompanists for performances and recordings, insisting that she "learned a lot from these young players, because they're raw and they come up with things that I would never think about doing."

1993 was Carter's biggest year of innovation, creating a program called Jazz Ahead, which took 20 students who were given the opportunity to spend an entire week training and composing with Carter, a program that still exists to this day and is hosted in The Kennedy Center.

Betty Carter is considered responsible for discovering great jazz talent, including John Hicks, Curtis Lundy, Mulgrew Miller, Cyrus Chestnut, Dave Holland, Stephen Scott, Kenny Washington, Benny Green, Tarik Shah, and Gregory Hutchinson.

Discography

CD compilations
 1990: Compact Jazz – (PolyGram) – Bet-Car and Verve recordings from 1976 to 1987
 1992: I Can't Help It – (Impulse!/GRP) – the Out There and The Modern Sound albums on one compact disc
 1999: Priceless Jazz – (GRP) – Peacock and ABC-Paramount recordings from 1958 and 1960
 2003: Betty Carter's Finest Hour – (Verve) – recordings from 1958 to 1992

On multi-artist compilations
 1988: "I'm Wishing" on Stay Awake: Various Interpretations of Music from Vintage Disney Films
 1997: "Lonely House" on September Songs – The Music of Kurt Weill

References

External links

 Seth Rogovoy, "Betty Carter: Still taking risks", Interview, Berkshire Eagle, November 14, 1997, via The BerkshireWeb. 
 Betty Carter profile at MTV
 Martin Weil, Betty Carter Obituary, 1998
 Betty Carter profile at All About Jazz
 "Betty Carter: Fiercely Individual", in NPR's Jazz Profiles series, August 14, 2008

1929 births
1998 deaths
ABC Records artists
African-American women composers
American women composers
American jazz composers
Women jazz composers
African-American jazz composers
American women jazz singers
American jazz singers
African-American women singer-songwriters
American contraltos
Bebop singers
Deaths from pancreatic cancer
Grammy Award winners
Musicians from Flint, Michigan
Scat singers
United States National Medal of Arts recipients
20th-century American singers
Singers from Detroit
20th-century American women singers
Jazz musicians from Michigan
20th-century jazz composers
20th-century women composers
20th-century African-American women singers
Singer-songwriters from Michigan
Deaths from cancer in New York (state)